"DJ Got Us Fallin' in Love" is a song by American singer Usher, featuring guest vocals from American rapper Pitbull, who co-wrote the song with the producers Shellback and Max Martin, with additional writing from Savan Kotecha. It was released to digital download on July 12, 2010, and sent to radio on August 18, 2010, as the first single from Usher's EP, Versus EP, which is an extension of his sixth studio album, Raymond v. Raymond. An electronic dance track with a Europop style (though the track was recorded in the United States), the song puts emphasis on its chorus, and follows the chord progression of Gm-F-E♭. It received mixed to positive reviews from critics, who favored its production and Usher's vocals, but criticized the song's lack of originality.

"DJ Got Us Fallin' in Love" peaked in the top-ten in over fifteen countries, becoming one of Usher's most successful singles. It reached the top-three on the Japan Hot 100, Canadian Hot 100, Hungary Singles Chart, French Singles Chart and ARIA Singles Chart. It peaked at number four on the Billboard Hot 100, marking Usher's sixteenth top-ten hit on the chart. It received a 4 times Platinum certification from the Australian Recording Industry Association (ARIA) and a 2 times Platinum certification from Canadian Recording Industry Association (CRIA). An accompanying music video, directed by Hiro Murai, shows Usher krumping and crip walking in a club environment.

Background and composition
"DJ Got Us Fallin' in Love" was leaked on the internet on December 1, 2010, with its follow-up single "Hot Tottie" leaked later that month. The song was released from Versus as the EP's mainstream single, whereas the latter track was released as the urban single. "DJ Got Us Fallin' in Love" features guest vocals by rapper Pitbull, who co-wrote it with Savan Kotecha, Max Martin and Shellback, with production handled by the latter two. It was recorded at Maratone Studios, Stockholm, Sweden and at Conway Studios, Los Angeles, California, handled by Sam Holland and Emily Wright. Mixing was done by Serban Ghenea at MixStar Studios. "DJ Got Us Fallin' in Love" runs for a duration of three minutes and forty seconds. This is the first of two songs that Kotecha, Martin, and Shellback have co-written for Usher, who would later join the three in co-writing his 2012 single "Scream".
According to the sheet music published at Musicnotes.com by Sony/ATV Music Publishing, "DJ Got Us Fallin' in Love" is written in the key of G Minor and has a tempo of 120 beats per minute. It follows the chord progression of Gm-F-E, and Usher's vocal range spans from the low note of G3 to the high note of B4. The song is described as a club track, that contains Europop and electronic dance influences. Bill Lamb of About.com noted that the song puts emphasis on its chorus, to which Usher sings "with appropriate passion".

Critical reception

The song received mixed to positive reviews from critics, with criticism directed mainly towards its lack of originality. AllMusic's Andy Kellman noted the song as a stand-out from Versus, along with "Hot Tottie" and "There Goes My Baby". Bill Lamb of About.com gave the song three-and-a-half stars out of five, praising Usher's vocal delivery and the song's "memorable chorus". Lamb criticized Pitbull's appearance, writing that his verse is "tossed on as a commercial gimmick", while also writing that the song doesn't compare well to Usher's "OMG" (2010). Billboard Michael Menachem described Pitbull's verse as "energizing" and wrote that Usher's "high register fits seamlessly with dance beats". Despite citing the lyrics as repetitive, he thought that the song "should keep clubgoers moving for months to come".

Sarah Rodman of Boston Globe depicted the song as a "dance thumper" and invites listeners to "lose themselves in the music". Los Angeles Times Jeff Weiss viewed the song as "generic" with Usher "singing generic paeans to a paramour’s eyes over a Eurovision-like Max Martin production." Eric Henderson of Slant Magazine disapproved of the track as a whole, writing "'DJ Got Us Fallin' In Love' is, while indistinguishable from any other overdriving club banger, one of the only songs in which Usher Raymond acknowledges an aphrodisiac more powerful than his own ab musk".

Chart performance
In the United States, the song debuted at number nineteen on the Billboard Hot 100 on the week ending December 21, 2010. It became Usher's second top-20 debut of 2010, after "OMG" opened at number fourteen in April. On the week ending December 24, 2010 "DJ Got Us Fallin' in Love" was positioned at number five. It was the first time that Usher—as a lead artist—had four singles on the top-40 of the Hot 100 simultaneously, with "OMG" at number twenty, "There Goes My Baby" at thirty-three and "Hot Tottie" at twenty-five. "DJ Got Us Fallin' in Love" remained on the Hot 100 for thirty weeks before dropping out, and peaked at number four, becoming Usher's sixteenth top-ten hit. The song peaked at number two on the Pop Songs Chart, and twelve on the Adult Pop Songs Chart. On the Hot 100 year-end charts for 2010 and 2011, it reached number twenty-two and sixty-five, respectively.

"DJ Got Us Fallin' in Love" peaked at number two on the Canadian Hot 100 chart, and was certified 2 times Platinum by the Canadian Recording Industry Association (CRIA), for shipments of over 160,000 copies. It peaked at number three on the Australian Singles Charts, and received a six times Platinum certification by the Australian Recording Industry Association (ARIA). The song reached number four on the New Zealand Singles Chart, and was certified Platinum by the Recording Industry Association of New Zealand (RIANZ). "DJ Got Us Fallin' in Love" was certified Platinum in the regions of México and Switzerland, by the AMPROFON and IFPI, respectively. The song achieved success in Europe, peaking at number three on the European Hot 100. Internationally "DJ Got Us Fallin' in Love" reached the top-ten in over fifteen countries, becoming one of Usher's most successful singles. It peaked in the top five in Japan, Hungary, France, Switzerland, Germany and Austria.

By February 2011, the song had reached 3 million in digital sales, according to Nielsen SoundScan, making it the second single of 2010 for both Usher and Pitbull to achieve the figure (Usher's "OMG" sold 3,957,000 copies, while "I Like It" performed by lead artist Enrique Iglesias sold 3,197,000). It reached its 4 million sales mark in the US in April 2013. As of June 2014, the song has sold 4,198,000 copies in the US.

Music video

The music video for the song premièred on August 26, 2010, on Vevo, and was directed by Hiro Murai. The video begins in a club environment, with misplaced furniture and a shattered glass bottle. The scene goes in reverse motion, people instantly appear, frozen in a raving action. As the scene is still reversing a DJ is spinning his booth, and the shattered glass bottle forms into its original state, the clubbers and the scene then start to move in forward but slow motion and the song begins with Usher approaching from a set of stairs. Usher sings and dances, while moving past clubbers who are still moving in slow motion while he is in moving normally. Once the chorus comes in, the clubbers begin dancing and raving in normal motion, periodically slowing down; Usher is krumping pass them, moving on to the next scene. Usher slides into a room with a large lit up window as a back drop. He performs choreography backed-up by female dancers for the second verse, and then returns to the original room with the second chorus coming in. A similar scene is involved to the first chorus, but this time Usher is dancing with the clubbers, who are still alternating in motion speed. Pitbull then begins his verse, and is sat in a V.I.P. area with three females, with the camera alternating between him, the clubbers and Usher. The video ends with its final scene, in a dance off, with Usher dancing adjacent to some of the clubbers. Once the climax of the chorus comes in, Usher jumps in the air and starts freely dancing along with the clubbers, with everyone in the same motion speed; Usher is primarily crip-walking. Usher and the clubbers then perform a final organized choreography, mainly krumping, and the video ends.

Live performances

Usher first performed "DJ Got Us Fallin' in Love" on Good Morning America, alongside "OMG". A few days later, Usher performed the song on The Ellen DeGeneres Show. On December 17, 2010, he performed the song alongside "There Goes My Baby" on Jimmy Kimmel Live!. Usher performed "DJ Got Us Fallin' in Love" in the season five finale of America's Got Talent, and in the seventh season of The X Factor. He performed the song during his OMG Tour, alongside several other tracks. The song was performed with "OMG" during the 2010 MTV Video Music Awards. VMA executive producer Dave Sirulnick told MTV News, "We said to him, 'We want to do the best televised dance routine that you've done in years. Let's show why you're the king.'" MTV Buzzworthy writer, Tamar Antai was present at the rehearsal for the show, and commented that the VMA crew was about to "pull off visual feats not just previously unseen and unparalleled at the VMAs, but unseen and unparalleled on TV."

The performance was received with critical acclaim. On Usher specifically Antai said the performance was like "liquid magic", saying, "He took it to the level that comes after the next level. The penthouse level." He was aided by about a dozen background dancers, the males in skeleton-like costumes, and the females donning a one-piece, gloves and boots. The "OMG" performance was accompanied by red laser lights, making an illusion as if the stage disappeared. The lights spelled out "O.M.G" as well as "Usher", as dancers lowered from the ceiling. Jayson Rodrgiguez of MTV News commented, "The singer moved and grooved, proving that he's the R&B star that everyone pays attention to for the big moments." Rochell D. Thomas, also of the site said "Call it what you will: talent, swag, skills...When he steps on the dance floor, some mysterious thing comes out of him and puts the G in groove." Thomas went on to say that Usher's dance moves would make "the late great Michael Jackson jealous" in the stage production "that included more special-effects bells and whistles than a summer blockbuster." Chris Ryan of MTV Buzzworthy also compared the performance to Jackson, calling it overall, "One part "Tron," one part laser show, one part Michael Jackson choreo tribute, and all spectacle."

Track listingsDigital download "DJ Got Us Fallin' in Love" – 3:42German CD Single "DJ Got Us Fallin' in Love" - 3:42
 "More" - 3:49Australian CD and digital Single "DJ Got Us Fallin' in Love" – 3:42
 "Lil Freak" (Mig & Rizzo Extended Mix) – 5:36Australian digital remixes No longer available to purchase in iTunes Australian store
 "DJ Got Us Fallin' in Love" – 3:42
 "DJ Got Us Fallin' in Love" (Almighty 12 Inch Mix) – 7:41
 "DJ Got Us Fallin' in Love" (Almighty Radio Mix) – 3:38
 "DJ Got Us Fallin' in Love" (Ad Brown Remix) – 7:36
 "DJ Got Us Fallin' in Love" (2 Darc Drum 'n' Bass) – 2:37
 "DJ Got Us Fallin' in Love" (2 Darc Funky House Remix) – 3:31
 "DJ Got Us Fallin' in Love" (MK Ultras Mix) – 3:34US CD single "DJ Got Us Fallin' in Love" – 3:42
 "OMG" (Cory Enemy Club Mix) - 5:55US iTunes Remixes "DJ Got Us Fallin' in Love" (HyperCrush Remix) – 4:05
 "DJ Got Us Fallin' in Love" (Precize Club Mix) – 4:23
 "DJ Got Us Fallin' in Love" (Precize Dub) – 4:23
 "DJ Got Us Fallin' in Love" (Versatile Club Mix) – 5:54
 "DJ Got Us Fallin' in Love" (Versatile Radio Mix) – 4:02
 "DJ Got Us Fallin' in Love" (Versatile Dub) – 5:54
 "DJ Got Us Fallin' in Love" (DJ Spider & Mr. Best Remix) – 6:07
 "DJ Got Us Fallin' in Love" (Jump Smokers Radio Mix) – 4:05
 "DJ Got Us Fallin' in Love" (Jump Smokers Club Mix) – 5:13
 "DJ Got Us Fallin' in Love" (Dino Roc Radio Mix) – 3:53

Personnel
Credits are adapted from the liner notes of Versus.Recording locations Vocal recording – Maratone Studios, Stockholm, Sweden; Conway Recording Studios, Los Angeles, California; Al Burna's Crib, Miami, Florida
 Mixing – MixStar Studios, Los Angeles, CaliforniaPersonnel'

 Songwriting – Max Martin, Shellback, Savan Kotecha, Armando C. Pérez
 Production and instruments – Max Martin, Shellback
 Recording – Sam Holland, Emily Wright
 Pitbull vocal recording – Al Burna

 Mixing – Serban Ghenea
 Mix engineer – John Hanes
 Photography – Walid Azami
 Assistant mix engineer – Tim Roberts

Charts

Weekly charts

Year-end charts

All-time charts

Certifications

Release history

See also 

 Revenge (cover)

References

External links
 

2010 singles
Usher (musician) songs
Pitbull (rapper) songs
Songs written by Savan Kotecha
Songs written by Max Martin
Songs written by Shellback (record producer)
Songs written by Pitbull (rapper)
Song recordings produced by Max Martin
Song recordings produced by Shellback (record producer)
2010 songs
LaFace Records singles